Archbishop Arsenije may refer to:

 Archbishop Arsenije I, Serbian Archbishop from 1233 to 1263
 Archbishop Arsenije II, Archbishop of Peć and Serbian Patriarch from 1457 to 1463
 Archbishop Arsenije III, Archbishop of Peć and Serbian Patriarch from 1674 to 1690 (1706)
 Archbishop Arsenije IV, Archbishop of Peć and Serbian Patriarch from 1725 to 1737 (1748)

See also
Arsenije (name)
Patriarch Arsenije (disambiguation)
List of heads of the Serbian Orthodox Church